Nicolas Cleppe (born 12 December 1995 in Tielt) is a Belgian former cyclo-cross and road cyclist, who rode for UCI Continental team .

Major results

Cyclo-cross

2015-2016
 Under-23 Superprestige
1st Spa-Francorchamps
2016–2017
 2nd National Under-23 Championships
2017–2018
 EKZ CrossTour
3rd Baden
2018–2019
 1st Jingle Cross Race 2
 EKZ CrossTour
3rd Hittnau
 3rd Radcross Grandprix

Road
2018
 1st  Mountains classification, Tour de Wallonie
 2nd Overall Tour de Liège
2019
 1st Overall Tour de Liège
1st Stage 5
 6th Internationale Wielertrofee Jong Maar Moedig

References

External links

1995 births
Living people
Belgian male cyclists
Cyclo-cross cyclists
People from Tielt
Cyclists from West Flanders
21st-century Belgian people